Pelophylax cypriensis, the Cyprus frog or Cyprus water frog, is a species of frog in the family Ranidae. It is endemic to Cyprus. It is widespread in Cyprus, with the highest density in the Troodos area, the most humid part of the island. It can live in both stagnant and brackish water, including small pools, streams, and ditches.

Description
It is a medium-sized frog, with females (body length up to 75mm) being larger than males (up to 65mm). The skin is rather warty and colouration varies widely. There are four unwebbed toes on the front legs and five webbed toes on the hindlegs. Males have paired external vocal sacs.

Gallery

References

Pelophylax
Amphibians of Europe
Endemic fauna of Cyprus
Amphibians described in 2012